The Moncouche Lake is a freshwater body at the head of the Moncouche River, in the unorganized territory of Lac-Moncouche, in the Lac-Saint-Jean-Est Regional County Municipality, in the administrative region of Saguenay–Lac-Saint-Jean, in province of Quebec, in Canada. Moncouche Lake is located in the western part of the Laurentides Wildlife Reserve. Its location is almost at the limit of the administrative regions of Saguenay–Lac-Saint-Jean and Capitale-Nationale.

A forest road runs along the southeast shore of Moncouche Lake. Some secondary forest roads serve this area for forestry and recreational tourism activities.

Forestry is the main economic activity in the sector; recreational tourism, second.

The surface of lake Moncouche is usually frozen from the beginning of December to the end of March, however the safe circulation on the ice is generally made from mid-December to mid-March.

Geography 
The main hydrographic slopes near Lake Moncouche are:
 North side: Saint-Véran Lake, Starr Lake, Huard Lake, Métabetchouane River;
 East side: Étoile lake, Contourné stream;
 South side: Contourné stream, rivière aux Montagnais;
 West side: Métabetchouane River.

Lac Moncouche comprises is connected (southwest side) to Saint-Véran Lake and is landlocked between the mountains. The mouth of the lake is located to the southwest and is located at:
  north-east of the confluence of the Moncouche River and the Métabetchouane River;
  northeast of Métabetchouane Lake;
  north-east of the Canadian National Kiskissink station;
  to the east of route 155, connecting La Tuque to Chambord;
  south-east of the confluence of the Métabetchouane River and Lac Saint-Jean.

Toponymy 
The toponym Lac Moncouche was formalized on December 5, 1968, by the Commission de toponymie du Québec.

Notes and references

See also 
 Lac-Saint-Jean-Est Regional County Municipality
 Lac-Moncouche, a TNO
 Laurentides Wildlife Reserve
 Rivière aux Montagnais
 Moncouche River
 Métabetchouane River
 Lac Saint-Jean
 Saguenay River
 St. Lawrence River
 List of lakes of Canada

Lakes of Saguenay–Lac-Saint-Jean
Lac-Saint-Jean-Est Regional County Municipality
Laurentides Wildlife Reserve